Heatons South is an electoral ward in the Metropolitan Borough of Stockport. It elects three Councillors to Stockport Metropolitan Borough Council using the first past the post electoral method, electing one Councillor every year without election on the fourth.

The ward covers the southern part of the Heatons bounded by the Manchester border, River Mersey and A6 including Heaton Mersey, Norris Bank, parts of Heaton Norris and Heaton Moor. The southern part of the ward contain part of the M60 Motorway. Together with Brinnington & Central, Davenport and Cale Green, Edgeley and Cheadle Heath, Heatons North and Manor, the ward lies in the Stockport Parliamentary Constituency.

Councillors
Heatons South electoral ward is represented in Westminster by Navendu Mishra MP for Stockport.

The ward is represented on Stockport Council by three councillors:Tom McGee (Lab), Dean Fitzpatrick (Lab), and Colin Foster (Lab)

 indicates seat up for re-election.

Elections in the 2010s

May 2019

May 2018

May 2016

May 2015

May 2014

May 2012

May 2011

References

External links
Stockport Metropolitan Borough Council

Wards of the Metropolitan Borough of Stockport